Kawanishi Station is the name of two train stations in Japan:

 Kawanishi Station (Osaka)
 Kawanishi Station (Yamaguchi)